Adolf Zander (16 January 1843 – 1 August 1914) was a German composer, organist at the Church of St. Sophia in Berlin, choir director, royal Prussian music director and founder of the new male Berliner Liedertafel choir.

Life
Zander was born in Barnewitz an der Havel (today part of Märkisch Luch). He worked as a musician and teacher, and in particular, he devoted himself to choral music. He founded, in 1881, the "Zander Quartet Society". From 1877 to 1880, he was the second conductor of the Berlin male voice choir "Liederlust", and in 1884 led both choirs together in the new Berlin Liedertafel.
 
Zander lived in Berlin around 1880 at 26 Höchste Straße, later at 16 Krautstraße, finally about 1895 on Graefestraß'. He died in Kleinaupa, Riesengebirge, aged 71, and was buried on the old Friedhof II der Sophiengemeinde Berlin cemetery in Berlin-Mitte.

See also
Friedrich Hieronymus Truhn
Neue Berliner Musikzeitung

References

Literature

Attribution
This article is based on a translation of the article at the German Wikipedia. A list of contributors can be found at de.Wikipedia.org History).

External links
Additional info on Adolf Zander at  deutscheslied.com

1843 births
1914 deaths
19th-century classical composers
19th-century German musicians
19th-century German male musicians
20th-century classical composers
20th-century German conductors (music)
20th-century German male musicians
German male classical composers
German male conductors (music)
German male organists
German organists
German Romantic composers